Lay Down Your Heart is a Canadian documentary film, directed by Marie Clements and released in 2022. The film is a portrait of Niall McNeil, a Vancouver-based theatre performer and writer with Down syndrome.

The film premiered on October 6, 2022, at the 2022 Vancouver International Film Festival, where it was named the winner of the Audience Award for the Portraits program.

References 

2022 films
2022 documentary films
Canadian documentary films
Films directed by Marie Clements
National Film Board of Canada documentaries
English-language Canadian films
2020s Canadian films